Los Anastacios is a corregimiento in Dolega District, Chiriquí Province, Panama. Its population as of 1990 was 2,170; its population as of 2000 was 2,679.

References

Corregimientos of Chiriquí Province